The 2002 Gerry Weber Open was a men's tennis tournament played on grass courts at the Gerry Weber Stadion in Halle, North Rhine-Westphalia in Germany and was part of the International Series of the 2002 ATP Tour. The tournament ran from 10 June until 16 June 2002. First-seeded Yevgeny Kafelnikov won the singles title.

Finals

Singles

 Yevgeny Kafelnikov defeated  Nicolas Kiefer 2–6, 6–4, 6–4
 It was Kafelnikov's 1st singles title of the year and the 25th of his career.

Doubles

 David Prinosil /  David Rikl defeated  Jonas Björkman /  Todd Woodbridge 4–6, 7–6(7–5), 7–5
 It was Prinosil's only title of the year and the 13th of his career. It was Rikl's 2nd title of the year and the 24th of his career.

References

External links
Official website 
 ATP Tournament Profile

 
Gerry Weber Open
Halle Open
2002 in German tennis